Załom may refer to the following places in Poland:
Załom, Goleniów County
Załom, Wałcz County
Załom, Szczecin